The Massachusetts Association for the Blind and Visually Impaired is the oldest operational organization in the United States that serves blind adults and elders. Headquartered in Brookline, Massachusetts, Helen Keller, Julia Ward Howe, and Edward Everett Hale have all served on their board. In the 1970s, the Eunice Kennedy Shriver Foundation helped the organization create some of the state's first community-based residential and vocational programs for adults with developmental disabilities.

References

External links

Blindness organizations in the United States
Brookline, Massachusetts
Non-profit organizations based in Massachusetts